Colombian Argentines are Argentine citizens of partial or full Colombian descent, or Colombian citizens who have migrated to and settled in Argentina. As of 2014, there were 87,574 Colombians living in Argentina, most of whom migrated during the 2010s.

As of 2018, Colombians were the fifth-largest expat community in Argentina, behind Paraguayans, Venezuelans, Bolivians and Chileans. The last census held in Argentina, in 2010, registered 17,576 Colombian migrants living permanently in the country.

Characteristics
One of the largest immigrant populations in Argentina, Colombian immigration grew considerably during the 2010s. While the 2001 national census in Argentina registered only 3,876 Colombian citizens residing in Argentina, the following census, held in 2010, registered 17,576, leading a 2016 IOM study characterizing it as an "emergent phenomenon". Many young Colombians choose Argentina as a temporary destination to complete higher education studies, as public universities in Argentina are free of charge, even for non-citizens. For this reason, many young immigrants settle in large urban centers close to major univerisites, such as Buenos Aires.

Economic crisis and lack of job opportunities in Argentina lead many of these immigrants to return to Colombia or migrate elsewhere once they finish their education.

Notable people
Ana María Campoy (1925–2006), actress
Frank Fabra (born 1991), footballer
Ivonne Guzmán (born 1984), singer
Francisco de Narváez (born 1953), politician and former gubernatorial candidate
Carlos Navarro Montoya (born 1966), footballer
Ana María Orozco (born 1973), actress
Walter Perazzo (born 1962), footballer
Margarita García Robayo (born 1989), novelist

See also
Argentina–Colombia relations
Immigration to Argentina
Venezuelan Argentines

References

External links

"Colombian immigrant's guide to Buenos Aires" – Colombian consulate in Argentina 

Immigration to Argentina
+
Argentina